Harper is an unincorporated community in Kitsap County, in the U.S. state of Washington. It is part of the Southworth census-designated place.

History
A post office called Harper was established in 1900. The community was named after F. C. Harper, a state legislator.

References

Unincorporated communities in Kitsap County, Washington
Unincorporated communities in Washington (state)